Harouna Bamogo is a Burkinabé football player.

Bamogo was released by WA Tlemcen at the end of the 2007-08 season as they were relegated from the Algerian Championnat National. He was subsequently signed by Khaleej on a free transfer in December 2008

He played for the Burkina Faso national football team twice in 2006.

References

External links

1989 births
Living people
Burkinabé footballers
Burkina Faso international footballers
Burkinabé expatriate sportspeople in Algeria
US des Forces Armées players
Expatriate footballers in Algeria
Sportspeople from Ouagadougou
Burkinabé expatriates in Libya
Rail Club du Kadiogo players
Expatriate footballers in Libya
WA Tlemcen players
MC Alger players
Association football defenders
21st-century Burkinabé people